Robert Brito Luciano or simply Robinho (born September 8, 1987 in Volta Redonda) is a Brazilian footballer, who plays for Nahdat Zemamra in Morocco.

Honours 
 Vasco da Gama
 Campeonato Brasileiro Série B: 2009

 Madureira
 Taça Rio: 2015

Notes

External links
Robinho at ZeroZero

1987 births
Living people
People from Volta Redonda
Brazilian footballers
Brazilian expatriate footballers
Campeonato Brasileiro Série A players
Campeonato Brasileiro Série B players
UAE Pro League players
Qatari Second Division players
Botola players
Volta Redonda FC players
CR Vasco da Gama players
Guarani FC players
Boa Esporte Clube players
Madureira Esporte Clube players
U.D. Leiria players
Primeira Liga players
Sharjah FC players
Mesaimeer SC players
Drogheda United F.C. players
Expatriate footballers in Portugal
Brazilian expatriate sportspeople in Portugal
Expatriate footballers in the United Arab Emirates
Brazilian expatriate sportspeople in the United Arab Emirates
Expatriate footballers in Qatar
Brazilian expatriate sportspeople in Qatar
Expatriate footballers in Morocco
Brazilian expatriate sportspeople in Morocco
Association football defenders
Sportspeople from Rio de Janeiro (state)
Renaissance Club Athletic Zemamra players